This is a chronological list of principal expeditions to Mir, a Soviet/Russian space station in low Earth orbit from 1986–2001. All principal Mir crews (those that were resident long-term on the station) were named , where EO stands for Expedition Operations, and the n is sequentially increased with each expedition. Visiting expeditions, which made short-term visits to the station during handovers between principal expeditions were named , and are excluded from this list (see List of human spaceflights to Mir for details). Mir commanders are listed in italics. "Duration" refers to the crew and does not always correspond to "Flight up" or "Flight down".

See also
 Mir
 List of Mir visitors
 List of human spaceflights to Mir
 List of ESA space expeditions
 List of International Space Station Expeditions

References

 Mir Expeditions

Mir expeditions
Mir